Taghkanic, a Native American word for "forest wilderness", can refer to:

 Taghkanic Creek, a stream running through Columbia County, New York
 Taghkanic, New York, a town and hamlet in Columbia County, New York
 East Taghkanic, New York, a hamlet in Taghkanic, New York
 West Taghkanic, New York, a hamlet in Taghkanic, New York

See also 
 Taconic (disambiguation)